Li Xinyuan (born October 1962) is a former Chinese politician who served as mayor and party secretary of Guigang in Guangxi. He was investigated by China's top anti-graft agency in March 2021. He was a representative of the 19th National Congress of the Chinese Communist Party.

Biography
Li was born in Taixing, Jiangsu, in October 1962. Beginning in 1980, he served in several posts in Liuzhou Compressor General Factory, including worker, deputy director, general manager, and chairman.

Li joined the Chinese Communist Party (CCP) in March 1989, and got involved in politics in April 2003, when he was appointed deputy party secretary and director of Liuzhou Economic Commission. He was vice mayor of Laibin in September 2007, and held that office until April 2009, when he was assigned to deputy secretary-general of Guangxi and deputy director of its General Office. In August 2011, he was transferred to Wuzhou and admitted to member of the standing committee of the CCP Wuzhou Municipal Committee, the city's top authority. He became mayor of Qinzhou in February 2013 before being assigned to the similar position in Guigang in February 2015. In December 2015, he rose to become party secretary, the top political position in the city. In February 2021, he was appointed party branch secretary of the Agriculture and Rural Affairs Department of Guangxi.

Downfall
On 16 March 2021, he was put under investigation for alleged "serious violations of discipline and laws" by the Central Commission for Discipline Inspection (CCDI), the party's internal disciplinary body, and the National Supervisory Commission, the highest anti-corruption agency of China. On November 22, he was expelled from the CCP and dismissed from public office.

References

1962 births
Living people
People from Taixing
Huazhong University of Science and Technology alumni
Central Party School of the Chinese Communist Party alumni
People's Republic of China politicians from Jiangsu
Chinese Communist Party politicians from Jiangsu